The Indycar iRacing Challenge (stylized as INDYCAR iRacing Challenge) was a series of esports events held as a temporary replacement of the suspended 2020 IndyCar Series due to the COVID-19 pandemic. The series was run on the platform of iRacing. The virtual races were broadcast on various IndyCar social media channels. Additionally, all races, but the first one, were broadcast live on NBCSN.

The races featured full time and part time drivers currently on the Indycar grid. They also featured guest drivers from other racing series' like Formula One and NASCAR.

Teams and Drivers

Schedule

Results

Driver Standings

Indianapolis race controversy
The final race of the series, the First Responder 175, saw a driving standards controversy. With nine laps to go in the race, Simon Pagenaud had been leading, only for him to ran into the wall. Pagenaud pitted following the crash and while on the pits, told over the radio "We take out Lando [Norris], let's do it", in reference to an earlier incident they had during the race. With two laps to go, Pagenaud, who was slowing down, promptly collided with Norris, who was leading at the time of the incident. Heading into the finish line, Santino Ferrucci took a hard left into then-leader Oliver Askew, who flipped; Scott McLaughlin crossed the finish line, from the pole.

Both Pagenaud and Ferrucci received criticism for their poor conduct during the race. Norris alleged that Pagenaud did so in order to prevent a non-IndyCar Series regular from winning the race; McLaren CEO Zak Brown tweeted that what Pagenaud did was not something expected from a former Indy 500 champion. Pagenaud insisted that he only intended to impede Norris, while his spotter Ben Bretzman denied instructing Pagenaud to crash into Norris. Ferrucci, in denying that his collision was deliberate, claimed that his collision at the end of the last lap was an attempt at a NASCAR-style side drafting, although during the stream he quipped that his clash was "worth it" and he did it "for the fans". Although iRacing's sporting code explicitly prohibited deliberate behavior, iRacing did not penalize both drivers, as it was deemed as a private league organized by INDYCAR themselves, rather than iRacing; INDYCAR themselves did not issue penalties for both Pagenaud or Ferrucci. Motorsport journalist Marshall Pruett later confirmed that an unnamed party involved in the incidents had also received death threats.

References

2020 in esports
Impact of the COVID-19 pandemic on motorsport